Sven Smajlagić (born 5 June 1990) is a Croatian professional basketball player for Cibona of the Croatian League and the ABA League. He has played also professionally in Bosnia and Herzegovina, France, Greece, Slovakia and Slovenia. In 2010–11 he played in the Euroleague with Cibona.

National team
Smajlagić has played for the Croatia's Under-16 and Under-18 national team.

Personal life
Smajlagić is the son of former handball player Irfan Smajlagić who won gold in the 1996 Summer Olympics with Croatia.

References

External sites
Sven Smajlagic at realgm.com
EuroLeague Profile at euroleague.net

1990 births
Living people
ALM Évreux Basket players
BC Nevėžis players
BK Iskra Svit players
Croatian expatriate basketball people in France
Croatian men's basketball players
Croatian people of Bosniak descent  
KK Bosna Royal players
KK Cedevita Junior players
KK Cibona players
KK Zabok players
Psychiko B.C. players
Shooting guards
Basketball players from Zagreb